Ayam geprek is an Indonesian crispy battered fried chicken crushed and mixed with hot and spicy sambal. Currently ayam geprek is commonly found in Indonesia and neighbouring countries, however its origin was from Yogyakarta in Java.

Geprek is Javanese term for "crushed" or "smashed", thus ayam geprek means "crushed chicken". It is quite similar to traditional East Javanese ayam penyet, as both are fried chicken smashed and mixed together with hot and spicy sambal chili paste. The difference is ayam penyet is a traditional Javanese ayam goreng half-cooked in bumbu kuning (yellow spice paste) and then deep fried in hot palm oil. Ayam geprek however, is more akin to Western-style (American) fried chicken, which is crispy fried chicken coated with batter, or known in Indonesia as ayam goreng tepung (battered fried chicken).

Origin
Ayam geprek gain its popularity across Indonesia in 2017 with numbers of outlets sprung in most of Indonesian cities. Its origin however, believed was from Yogyakarta, from the creation of Mrs. Ruminah or popularly known as Bu Rum. In 2003, Bu Rum's customer requested her ayam goreng tepung (battered fried chicken) to be smashed and topped with sambal chili paste. Subsequently this smashed spicy crispy fried chicken has gain wider popularity, as numbers of restaurants copied the recipe.

Another source argued, that the current popularity of ayam geprek was initiated by local fast food chain Quick Chicken, that launched their product called "American Penyet" in 2013. Bedi Zubaedi, founder and CEO of Quick Chicken claimed that before the ayam geprek was as popular, they had made an identical dish named "American Penyet". This menu is a blend of Western style fried chicken served in Indonesian penyet method mixed with sambal bajak.

Ayam geprek is commonly served with sambal chili paste, however today its new variants might be served with additional mozzarella cheese toppings and kol goreng (fried cabbage).

Commercialisation 

 Geprek Bensu is a fast food chain revolving around ayam geprek, with locations in Indonesia, Hong Kong, and Malaysia.

See also

 Fried chicken
 Ayam goreng
 Ayam penyet

References

Indonesian chicken dishes
Javanese cuisine
Fried chicken